The Development Marketplace (DM) Award is a competitive grant program
administered by the World Bank. Since 1998, the DM has awarded more
than $46 million to some 1,000 early-stage, innovative projects worldwide.

Projects are selected based on:
 Innovation
 Potential for Growth
 Visible benefits
 Realism
 Sustainability

Development Marketplace Award winners 
 2000: Roundabout PlayPump.
 2003: "HotPot" solar oven by Solar Household Energy, Inc. (SHE) and Fondo Mexicano para la Conservacion de la Naturaleza (FMCN).
 2003: Kanchan Arsenic Filter Project for Rural Nepal. See also Amy B. Smith.
 2004: Scojo Foundation for Reading Glasses for the Poor in India.
 2005: Solar Tuki
 2007: Small portable "Weza" electric generator for rural Rwanda.
 2008: UV Bucket for killing bacteria in water in rural Mexico, by Florence Cassassuce.

Full Listings 
 Winners of 2000 Development Marketplace
 Winners of 2002 Development Marketplace
 Winners of 2003 Development Marketplace
 Winners of 2005 Development Marketplace
 Winners of 2006 Development Marketplace

See also

 List of economics awards

References 
World Bank Development Marketplace site
HotPot

Economic development awards
Sustainable business